WHIT (1550 AM) is a radio station based in Madison, Wisconsin and broadcasting a classic country format. The station is currently owned by Mid-West Family Broadcasting.

History
Originally owned by Hudson Communications, the station launched as WMAD in 1964 and aired a Top 40 format. The station later became WWQM in 1977 and, branded as "15Q" (shortened from the original concept "155QM"), aired an automated golden oldies format from 1977 to 1980 when it became WHIT. By the late 1990s/early 2000s, the station was airing an all-sports format known as "The Team."

In 2001, the station turned to an adult standards format as WTUX ("The Tux"), affiliated with the Music of Your Life, Jones Standards and Dial Global America's Best Music networks. On January 19, 2009, the station dropped adult standards and switched back to an automated oldies format, readopting the WHIT legacy call sign and focusing on music from the 1950s and 1960s. (As part of WHIT's flip, another Mid-West Family station in Michigan that had the WHIT call sign was assigned the WSCY calls to match its FM simulcast station.) WHIT played oldies on an automated basis until joining the nationally distributed True Oldies Channel on November 14, 2011.

On December 6, 2013, WHIT changed their format from oldies to classic country, branded as "Hank on AM 1550".

On October 8, 2020, WHIT relaunched as "97.7 The Farm", still retaining the classic country format, but with an enhanced farm news coverage from Pam Jahnke’s "Mid-West Farm Report". In addition to airing that show daily from 5-6am, Jahnke and Josh Scramlin will have additional news updates and features all day on The Farm.

Previous logos
 (WHIT's logo under previous oldies format)
 (WHIT's logo under previous "Hank" branding)

References

External links
WHIT official website

FCC History Cards for WHIT

HIT
Classic country radio stations in the United States
Radio stations established in 1964
HIT